This is a list of notable Cajuns, often from the Acadiana or the Greater New Orleans region of French Louisiana, though not limited in geographic origin. To be included in this list, the person must have a Wikipedia article showing they are Cajuns or Cajun descent.

Academia

Actors, models, and entertainment

Art, design

Chefs, restauranteurs

Literature, writers, poets

Military

Music

Politics, law

Space Flight

Sports

See also
List of Acadians
List of French Americans
List of Louisiana Creoles
List of people related to Cajun music

References

Cajun people
People from Louisiana
Lists of American people by ethnic or national origin
Lists of people by ethnicity